Guus is a common Dutch given name. It is a diminutive of the name Augustus. The female variant of this name is "Guusje".

People named Guus include:

 Guus Albregts (1900–1980), Dutch economist and politician
 Guus Berkhout (born 1940), Dutch engineer
 Guus Bierings (born 1956), Dutch cyclist and Olympic competitor 
 Guus Dräger (1917–1989), Dutch footballer
 Guus Haak (born 1937), Dutch footballer
 Guus van Hecking Colenbrander (1887–1945), Dutch footballer
 Guus Hiddink (born 1946), Dutch football manager and coach
 Guus Hoogmoed (born 1981), Dutch sprinter
 Guus Hupperts (born 1992), Dutch footballer
 Guus Janssen (born 1951), Dutch composer, recording artist and multi-instrumentalist
 Guus Joppen (born 1989), Dutch footballer
 Guus Kessler (1888–1972), Dutch industrialist 
 Guus Kouwenhoven (born 1942), Dutch convicted arms trafficker
 Guus Kuijer (born 1942), Dutch author
 Guus Lutjens (1884–1974), Dutch footballer
 Guus Meeuwis (born 1972), Dutch singer-songwriter
 Guus Scheffer (1898–1952), Dutch weightlifter and Olympic competitor
 Guus Vogels (born 1975), Dutch field hockey goalkeeper and Olympic medalist

Dutch masculine given names

nl:Augustus (voornaam)#Guus